Crazy Machines Elements is a puzzle video game developed by Fakt Software and published by DTP Entertainment for Microsoft Windows, PlayStation Network, and Xbox Live Arcade in 2011.

Reception

The game received "mixed" reviews on all platforms according to the review aggregation website Metacritic.

References

External links
 

2011 video games
DTP Entertainment games
PlayStation 3 games
PlayStation Network games
Puzzle video games
Single-player video games
Video games developed in Germany
Windows games
Xbox 360 games
Xbox 360 Live Arcade games
Fakt Software games